Events from the year 1766 in Denmark.

Incumbents
 Monarch – Frederick V (until 14 January), Christian VII
 Prime minister –  Count Johann Hartwig Ernst von Bernstorff

Events
 14 January – Crown Prince Christian becomes King Christian VII of Denmark.
 9 September  when Christian VII sells most of the royal holdings on the island of Falster (divided into 10 estates) by auction to make payments on Denmark's sovereign debt

 Kongens Stubbekøbingjorder (Carlsfelt) is sold to Jørgen Schiønning on behalf of Prince Charles of Hesse-Kassel.
 Corselitze is sold to Prince Charles of Hesse-Kassel-,
 Egensegård (later Valnæsgård is sold to Hans Bergeshagen,
 Gjedsergaard is sold to Frederik Holck-Winterfeldt-
 Hvededahl
 Orupgaard  is sold to  Christian Hincheldey.
 Skiørringgaard 
  Slangerup 
 Klodskov (Estate No. 7, later Vennerslund) is sold to  Peter Thestrup for 59724 rigsdale. 
 Vesterborg 
 Skørringe os sold to Ole Jensen Stampe.

 20 October - Christian Tychsen is appointed as governor of the Danish Gold Coast as the first on a regular basis.
 4 November Wedding of Gustav III and Sophia Magdalena
 8 November
 The wedding of King Christian VII and Caroline Matilda of Great Britain takes place at Christiansborg Palace accompanied by extensive celebrations throughout the city.
 The event is in the same time the inauguration of the Great Hall of the still not completed royal palace..

Undated
 Anna Sophie Magdalene Frederikke Ulrikke demands a pension from the Danish royal house with the claim that she was the illegitimate daughter of King Christian VI.

Culture

Theatre
 14 November  Henrik Ibsen's The Pillars of Society premieres at Odense Theatre.

Deaths
 January 14 – Frederick V, Danish king (born 1723)
 * 7 May – Just Fabritius,  businessman (norn 1703)
 September 17 – Philip de Lange, architect (norn c. 1705)

References

 
Years of the 18th century in Denmark
Denmark
Denmark
1760s in Denmark